The 1977 Troy State Trojans football team represented Troy State University (now known as Troy University) as a member of the Gulf South Conference (GSC) during the 1977 NCAA Division II football season. Led by second-year head coach Charlie Bradshaw, the Trojans compiled an overall record of 6–4 with a mark of 6–2 in conference play, and finished tied for second in the GSC.

Schedule

References

Troy State
Troy Trojans football seasons
Troy State Trojans football